Arnettsville is an unincorporated community in Monongalia County, West Virginia, United States. It lies south of Georgetown on U.S. Route 19. Arnettsville was originally known as Yukon. It is included in the Morgantown, West Virginia Metropolitan Statistical Area.

Arnettsville was named for a pioneer merchant named Arnett.

Notable person
 Mary Miller Glasscock, First Lady of West Virginia (1909–13), was born in Arnettsville.

References

Unincorporated communities in Monongalia County, West Virginia
Unincorporated communities in West Virginia
Morgantown metropolitan area